Triston Hodge (born 9 October 1994), sometimes incorrectly referred to as Tristan Hodge, is a Trinidadian professional footballer who plays as a defender for USL Championship side Hartford Athletic and the Trinidad and Tobago national team.

Club career
Hodge made his Toronto FC II debut as a half-time substitute as in a match opposed to Charlotte Independence.

After two seasons on loan to USL Championship side Memphis 901 FC, Hodge move permanently to Colorado Springs Switchbacks on 25 January 2021.

On 19 December 2022, it was announced that Hodge would join USL Championship side Hartford Athletic for the 2023 season.

International career
Prior to the 2017 Caribbean Cup qualification, the Trinidad and Tobago coach Stephen Hart selected a 21-man squad, Hodge being included.

References

External links
 

Living people
1994 births
USL Championship players
Trinidad and Tobago footballers
Association football defenders
Trinidad and Tobago international footballers
Footballers at the 2015 Pan American Games
W Connection F.C. players
Toronto FC II players
Memphis 901 FC players
Colorado Springs Switchbacks FC players
Hartford Athletic players
Trinidad and Tobago expatriate footballers
Trinidad and Tobago expatriate sportspeople in the United States
Expatriate soccer players in the United States